Angus Marshall (27 January 1906 – 29 August 1969) was an Australian cricketer. He played in four first-class matches for Queensland between 1929 and 1933.

See also
 List of Queensland first-class cricketers

References

External links
 

1906 births
1969 deaths
Australian cricketers
Queensland cricketers
Guyanese emigrants to Australia